Walking art is the act of walking as an artistic practice. While walking artists have diverse interests and backgrounds, many scholars have foregrounded the way it explores the connections between the mind and body, as well as space and time. Some artists consider walking an artistic end in itself, while others use walking as a means of mark-making, storytelling, social practice, or to create work in other artistic media. Despite emerging from a variety of artistic and literary traditions, a 'common feature [of walking art] is the engagement of the body in a process of walking through a landscape based on a specific artistic design.':161

Origins 
In her influential book Wanderlust, Rebecca Solnit traces the origins of walking as an artistic practice to the 1960s, when 'a new realm of walking opened up [ . . . ] walking as art.':267 Other scholars, such as Francesco Careri and Blake Morris, have highlighted the importance of the Dada excursion of 1921, when the French contingent of the Dada movement led a walk at the Church of Sant-Julien-le-Pauvre in Paris.:34 Scholars have also noted the strong connection between writing and walking, for example in the walks of Romantic poets and artists. Philosophers have also used walking as part of their work, from the peripatetic school of the Ancient Greeks to phenomenology in the works of Husserl or Merleau-Ponty. As Karen O'Rourke remarks, 'walking has gathered practitioners from nearly every field [ . . . and] blurs the borders between the arts, between artist and audience'.:43

Literary precedents

The Romantics 
Numerous scholars have cited the British Romantics as exercising 'an outsized influence on contemporary considerations of walking' in the Western world.:24 Solnit has argued that Romantics such as John Clare, Samuel Taylor Coleridge, Thomas De Quincey, John Keats, and William and Dorothy Wordsworth, helped establish walking as 'an expressive medium'.:101 In the United States, Henry David Thoreau, Ralph Waldo Emerson, and Walt Whitman were influential in establishing the relationship between writing and walking.

The flâneur 
Another important precedent is the French figure of the flâneur — a 'passionate spectator', typically male,:40 who goes on detached strolls through urban environments. Fiona Wilkie argues the flâneur is one of the 'standard positions from which to theorize one's walking'.:19 Initially inspired by Edgar Allen Poe's short story, 'The Man of the Crowd',:8 it was popularised through the writings of Charles Baudelaire and Walter Benjamin's subsequent theorisations of those writings.

Eastern traditions 
Eastern literary traditions have also influenced the development of walking as an artistic practice. The seventeenth-century Japanese poet Matsuo Bashō was a peripatetic poet who is credited for formalizing haiku, and for whom the aesthetics of poetry and walking were closely linked. Hamish Fulton has cited Bashō as an influence on his practice, evident in his writing as well as his walking. Bashō is also an inspiration for Alec Finlay, as seen in his 2011 work The Road North, which draws on Bashō's journals.

Dadaism and Surrealism 
Numerous scholars have agreed that the Dada excursion of 1921 was the first work where the act of walking itself was the art.:13 The excursion was organized by artists who would go on to found the Surrealist art movement, such as André Breton and Louis Aragon, as well as important members of the Dada movement, including Tristan Tzara and Francis Picabia.:34 Walking would become an important aspect of Surrealism, from 'unplanned group walks through Paris to Meret Oppenheim's fabled walks on high ledges',:36 and play a central role in canonical Surrealist texts, such as Aragon's Le Paysan de Paris (1926), Breton's Nadja (1928) and Philippe Soupault's Last Nights of Paris (1928).

The Surrealists viewed walking as 'a medium through which to enter into contact with the unconscious part of the territory.':79 These walks, or deambulations, as the Surrealists called them, aimed for 'the achievement of a state of hypnosis by walking, a disorienting loss of control.':79 In one ill-fated deambulation, André Breton, Louis Aragon, Max Morise, and Roger Vitrac traveled to Blois, a town selected at random from a map, and set off for a walk in the countryside.:36 The four made observations and automatic writings as they walked, but the walk ended in 'mounting hostility, fatigue, and disorientation'. Nevertheless, the Surrealists viewed the very aimlessness and disorientation of the experience as 'hardly disappointing, no matter how narrow its range, because it probed the boundaries between waking life and dream life'.

The Letterist and Situationist Internationals 

The Situationist International was formed in 1957 by members of the Letterist International, The International Movement for an Imaginist Bauhaus and the London Psychogeographical Society.:29 These groups, and in particular the Letterists, had already started to explore the potential of walking as a revolutionary and artistic practice and cited the Dadaists and Surrealists as key influences.:181 As the Situationist International they continued to develop walking tactics that have been influential to contemporary artists.

Essential to their overall revolutionary and artistic programme was the development of the Letterist practice of the dérive. Dérive, which literally means drift in French, is an intentional method of exploring, understanding and participating in the urban landscape. Unlike aimless Surrealist deambulations, the dérive follows certain procedures in order to understand and intervene in the urban environment and is associated with the field of psychogeography. . The Situationists were interested in both the internal and external effects of the dérive: the walker was meant to study the world around them and experience an internal sense of emotional disorientation. In many cases, disorientation was achieved with the aid of alcohol.

Fluxus 
For Fluxus, walking fit into a larger strategy of making art out of everyday experiences. Fluxus artists defamiliarized the everyday by calling attention to overlooked details. Benjamin Patterson exemplifies this approach with a piece called Stand Erect in his artists' book Methods and Processes (1961). The text piece describes the process of walking in a set of instructions that are both accurate and all but impossible to follow. According to Dick Higgins and Ken Friedman, key tenets of Fluxus include simplicity, presence in time, and the unity of art and life — all of which apply readily to walking art. Art historian and critic Lori Waxman contrasts the psychoanalytical individualism of Surrealism and overt politics of the Situationists with a more experimental, collective ethos in Fluxus. By creating participatory works and scores for other artists to follow, Fluxus popularized walking as an art practice. One particularly influential piece is La Monte Young's 1960 Composition 1960 #10: 'Draw a straight line and follow it.' Many artists have done just that.

Dematerialization and Sculpture in the Expanded Field 
Richard Long's work, A Line Made by Walking (1967), consists of a photograph depicting 'a patch of grass Long trampled underfoot through a repetitive walking practice'.:5 It is 'routinely cited as the first work of walking art'.:5:26 Rosalind Krauss includes Long's walking art in her conception of sculpture in the expanded field. Likewise, Lucy Lippard identifies it as part of the dematerialization of art. Lippard and John Chandler identify two strains of dematerialized art: art as idea and art as action. Walking art often falls into the latter category — art as action. Lippard cites Stanley Brouwn as an artist whose walking art stems from the dematerialization of conceptual art. The following piece from 1962, quoted in its entirety, illustrates Brouwn's approach: 'a walk from a to b.'

Contemporary Practices 
Since the early 2000s there has been an increased interest in walking as an artistic practice. This has been exemplified by the establishment of a variety of walking networks, including the Walking Artists Network.

Psychogeography 
Merlin Coverly has argued that the vague definition of psychogeography has allowed numerous artists to identify with the practice without yielding many tangible results and that the playful, avant-garde origins of the dérive ultimately resisted Debord's call for rigor. In 2006, Morag Rose founded the Loiterers Resistance Movement in Manchester, which is now 'the most consistently active psychogeography group in the United Kingdom.':81 Rose identifies 'three brands of contemporary psychogeography: literary, activist and creative', which overlap and intersect.:81 Other examples of contemporary psychogeography include Paul Harfleet's Pansy Project. Harfleet plants pansies at all the locations where he has been subjected to homophobic slurs and documents them online.

Major themes and motifs

Pilgrimage 
Pilgrimage continues to inform aesthetic and spiritual interpretations of walking, and artists take advantage of these strong associations. Hamish Fulton followed an ancient route from Winchester to Canterbury for his 165-mile walk, The Pilgrim's Way (1971). Fulton has also explored non-Western spiritual walking, as in Kora (2009), which references the Tibetan Kora — a circumambulatory meditation or pilgrimage.

Protests and processions 
Protests and processions are a frequent reference point for walking artists, whether walking solo or with a group. For The Modern Procession (2002), Francis Alÿs borrowed the trappings of an elaborate religious procession to ritually move works from MoMA in Manhattan to Queens. Following a Peruvian brass band, palanquins bearing (replica) works from MoMA's collection were carried by over 150 volunteers through the streets of New York City and across the Queensboro Bridge. 

In 2011, Hamish Fulton staged Slowalk (In support of Ai Weiwei) as a protest against the artist's imprisonment. Slowalk was a collective piece in which ninety-nine participants attempted to silently traverse Turbine Hall at the Tate Modern in precisely thirty minutes. The protest coincided with Ai Weiwei's exhibition Sunflower Seeds, also at the Tate. 

In 2012, Clare Qualmann devised Perambulator, a 'mass processional' of people pushing strollers and prams through the streets of London, in order to highlight 'the inhospitable environment for pram walking' in London. In 2014, she created another version of the walk in Scotland, as part of Deveron Project's Slow Marathon in Huntly, Scotland.:121 

Regina José Galindo's Who Can Erase the Traces? (2003) protests an unconstitutional election, but does so with a track of bloody footprints between government buildings.

Following 
Following is another strategy used by walking artists, epitomized by Vito Acconci's Following Piece (1969). For nearly a month, Acconci would pick a stranger to follow and record their whereabouts in a notebook until they entered a private place where he could no longer follow. The same year Yoko Ono would create her film Rape (1969), a 'candid recording' in which a camera crew pursues a foreign woman through London, following her into her apartment until she collapses, terrified, in the corner. The well-known photographs that comprise the work were re-staged after the fact. 

A decade later, Sophie Calle followed a man for thirteen days in Venice and noted his movements like a detective. Eventually she is discovered, but continues the project, which becomes the artists' book Suite Vénitienne in 1983 and an exhibition in 1996.

Endurance 
Endurance is a component of many walking artists' practice. Guido van der Werve is an artist and marathon runner whose work explores repetition, endurance, and exhaustion. In 2011 he completed Nummer dertient, effugio C: you're always only half a day away, in which he ran laps around his house for twelve hours. Other artists test their endurance over great distances. This is the case in Two Lovers — the Great Wall Walk (1988) by performance artists Marina Abramović and Ulay. The two walked from opposite ends of the Great Wall of China and, after ninety days, met in the middle, embraced, and then parted ways to complete their journey from end to end.

Pushing and pulling 
Pushing and pulling often accompany walking, especially for artists interested in endurance or absurdity. David Hammons walked down the streets of New York City, kicking a metal bucket, in his work Phat Free (1995–1999). Alÿs pushed an ice block down the streets of Mexico City until it melted in Sometimes Making Something Leads to Nothing (1997). In House and Universe (2012–2013), Mary Mattingly bundled all of her belongings into a massive ball, which she then dragged through the streets behind her.

Migration and borders 
Migration and borders are frequent themes for walking artists since they represent extreme cases of mobility and its limit. Janine Antoni and Paul Ramirez-Jonas explore politics and power dynamics in their piece Migration (1999). The video piece shows the barefoot artists following literally in one another's footsteps on a beach, obliterating the other's footprint with each step. Francis Alÿs created The Green Line (Sometimes Doing Something Poetic Can Become Political, and Sometimes Doing Something Political Can Become Poetic) (2004) by dripping green paint from a can while he walked the green line that separates Jewish and Arab quarters of Jerusalem.

Deveron Project's Slow Marathon, a 'mass participation walk of twenty-six miles', has been examining borders and migration since Mihret Kebede and Claudia Zieske developed it in 2013.:108 Kebede originally wanted to walk from her home in Addis Ababa, Ethiopia to Scotland, but 'the combination of visa restrictions, harsh desert terrain, and the dangerous landscape' made the journey impossible. Instead she developed Slow Marathon: A 5,850 Miles Walk from Addis to Scotland and Back (2013), 'an accumulative marathon and shoelace exchange that combined the steps of a variety of participants from Huntly, Addis Ababa and other locations throughout the world to walk the 5,850 miles that make up the journey.' The project 'set up an intercultural exchange that interrogated borders and boundaries – physical, bureaucratic and imagined – through the act of walking'. The project has since occurred seven times with different artists. In 2018 it occurred simultaneously in Gaza and Huntly, a collaboration between artists May Murad in Palestine and Rachel Ashton in Scotland. Murad was unable to leave Palestine, and the limited terrain her group was able to walk, highlighted the different 'experiences of boundaries, borders, and access to land.':120

Mapping 
Mapping serves as a reference point as well as a form of documentation for many walking artists. John Baldessari's California Map Project (1969) imagines that the text on a map is actually a feature of the landscape, as if viewed from above. The artist walked the land to spell CALIFORNIA in large letters made from ephemeral materials in the geographic locations where those letters appeared on a map. The Naked City: Illustration de l'hypothèse des plaques tournantes en psychogéographique (1957) by Guy Debord and Asger Jorn fragments and reconfigures a map of Paris to convey the experience of walking, or drifting, through the city. The map reflects what Debord found interesting rather than the city's actual geography. Richard Long sometimes traces his (often circular) walks onto conventional maps, as in Cerne Abbas Walk (1975). Long also makes experimental maps like Wind Line (1985) and Dartmoor Wind Circle (1988) which spatially represent the direction of the wind during his walk.

Footprints 
Footprints are a direct way for artists to leave a visible trace of their walking activity. Rudolf Stingel left his footprints in a Styrofoam slab by treading in boots soaked with acetone. Stuart Horodner comments that the untitled work from 2000 recalls the iconic images of the first footprints on the moon. In a series called Dirt Events, Curtis Mitchell fixes his footprints by caking dirt onto a store-bought rug and then walking on it until the rug reemerges. Gutai artist Akira Kanayama's 1956 work Ashiato (footprints) was a continuous sheet of vinyl with uniform painted footprints, running nearly 100 meters through the Outdoor Gutai Art Exhibition in Ashiya Park.

Footwear 
Footwear has also been used by artists to represent walking or to stand in for an absent walker. In her series 100 Boots (1971–1973), Eleanor Antin photographed formations of empty boots to reference the Vietnam War. In his score,Taking a Shoe for a Walk 1989, Allan Kaprow calls for 'pulling a shoe on a string through the city' and bandaging one's own shoes as the shoe being dragged wears out. The art collective GRAV invited passers-by to wear spring-loaded shoes during their event, A Day in the Street (1966), which was designed to encourage more active engagement with the city. Marcus Coates made custom footwear for his 1999 piece Stoat, for which each shoe is a short wooden board balanced on two wooden pegs, which Coates lashed to his feet. Video shows the artist wobbling and shuffling down a gravel path.

Group walks and guided walks 
Carmen Papalia, a blind artist who creates participatory art, developed the work Blind Field Shuttle (2017) in which participants walk in a single-file line with their eyes closed, maintaining physical contact with one another, to follow Papalia on a guided walk. Simon Pope brings along one walker at a time for his series Memorial Walks (2007–2012). Participants were asked to view a landscape painting before walking and then to envision a particular tree from the painting on their walk, mentally transplanting it into the countryside. Mowry Baden creates interactive sculptures that guide the way the viewer walks through them. His work K Walk (1969) is a set of metal bars that perfectly match the gait of Baden's wife but impede anyone else who tries to walk through the sculpture.

Documenting walking art 
Artists often use walking as a process for creating work in other media, or present their walks through documentation, rather than the walk itself. Francis Alÿs, who often uses walking as part of his artistic process, has noted that 'any work a visual artist is likely to produce, I would say more than 90% of its perception will happen through documentation and not the live event, documentation being a film, a photograph, a text, any possible media.':7 Richard Long and Hamish Fulton are particularly known for their use of walking to produce work in other artistic media and helped to establish the form.:5 Fulton, however, has argued that any document or artwork based on a walk 'will contradict the spirit of the walk', noting, '[e]ither you completed the walk or you didn't, and if two people make the same walk they will experience it in different ways.':192 Other artists use video to capture the duration of their walks, like David Hammons. Janet Cardiff and her partner George Bures Miller also work in video, but they are especially known for sound pieces, including audio walks.

Notable walking artists 
 Marina Abramović
 Vito Acconci
 Francis Alÿs
 Janine Antoni

 Janet Cardiff
 Alec Finlay

 Hamish Fulton
 Sharon Harper
 Deirdre Heddon
 Akira Kanayama
 Richard Long
 Tom Marioni
 George Bures Miller
 Curtis Mitchell
 François Morelli
 Yoko Ono
 Clare Qualmann
 Ulay
 Richard Wentworth
See also Category:Walking artists.

Organizations 
 Loiterers Resistance Movement
 Walking Artists Network
 The Walking Institute

Exhibitions 
 'Walking and Thinking and Walking'. 1996, Louisiana Art Museum, Denmark.
 Les Figures de la marche, un siècle d'arpenteurs de Rodin à Neuman. 2000-2001. Musée Picasso, Antibes.
 Horodner, Stuart, curator. Walk Ways. 2002–2004, Independent Curators International. traveling exhibition.
 Walk On: 40 Years of Walking. 2013, Pitshangar Manor Gallery, Northern Gallery of Contemporary Art, Midlands Art Centre Birmingham, Plymouth City Museum and Gallery.
 Artists Walks and the Persistence of Peripateticism. 2013, Dorsky Curatorial Gallery, New York City.
 Walking Artists Network. The Walking Encyclopaedia. 2014, Airspace Gallery, Stoke-on-Trent.
 Walking Sculpture 1967-2015. 2015, deCordova Sculpture Park and Museum, Lincoln, Massachusetts.
 Qualmann, Clare and Amy Sharrocks. WALKING WOMEN. 2016, Somerset House, London and Edinburgh Fringe.
 Loitering with Intent. 2016, People's History Museum, Manchester.
 Adams, Rachel, curator. Wanderlust: Actions, Traces, Journeys, 1967–2017. 2017–2018, University at Buffalo Art Galleries and Des Moines Art Center, traveling exhibition.
 S.T.E.P. 2018. Flux Factory and Queens Museum, New York City.

References 

Walking art